The Racquet and Tennis Club, familiarly known as the R&T, is a private social and athletic club at 370 Park Avenue, between East 52nd and 53rd Streets in Midtown Manhattan, New York City.

History
The Racquet Court Club opened in 1876 at 55 West 26th Street. It had two racquets courts, an indoor running track and two bowling alleys, but it did not have a tennis court.  In 1890, it merged into the newly incorporated Racquet and Tennis Club, which planned to build a tennis court, moving the following year to a second, larger club house at 27 West 43rd Street (1891). This second club house had two racquets courts, one fives court and one court tennis court.  The Club moved to its third, and current, home in 1918.

Building
The R&T's current clubhouse was designed by William Symmes Richardson, a partner at McKim, Mead, and White. The facility was built on a parcel offered for lease by a member of the club, Robert Goelet. Richardson, who had primary design responsibility for Pennsylvania Station and the Hotel Pennsylvania, proposed an integrated Italian Renaissance style and his firm's proposal was presented to the membership for approval in April 1916. In addition to offering its members more spacious amenities, the move to Park Avenue afforded more consistent natural light for the skylit playing courts, as well a generally more desirable location. Construction began on December 20, 1916 and was completed on September 7, 1918.  The builder was Mark Edlitz, and the estimated cost was $500,000.  Board of Directors at this time included financier Ogden Mills and sportsman Harry Payne Whitney.

The resulting building is about 200 feet by 100 feet (30 m x 60 m) and five stories tall.  The exterior is stone and brick over a structural steel frame.  According to the original plans, the interior contained three dining rooms, a billiard room, library, lounge, gymnasium, swimming pool, five squash courts, two court tennis courts, and two racquets courts.  Today, there are four singles squash courts, one hardball squash doubles court, one racquets court and two court tennis courts. The club's court facilities are considered among the finest in the world.

The structure is representative of the ornate private clubs constructed in New York during the early twentieth century.  McKim, Mead and White had previously designed the Harvard Club of New York, the Century Association and the University Club of New York. Today, it performs an important architectural role on Park Avenue as a foil to the Seagram Building, directly across the avenue, and the Lever House, across 53rd Street, and other corporate structures in the glass-clad vocabulary of International Modernism.

The building was designated a NYC Landmark in 1979 and on July 21, 1983, the building was listed in the National Register of Historic Places.

The club sold its air rights on Park Avenue to the developer of the Park Avenue Plaza skyscraper in 1978. The glass-clad skyscraper rises in the middle of the block, immediately behind the club.

Squash
Club members and professionals are active in squash and the R & T has hosted many national and international competitions. Members who have been U.S. Squash National Champions include Palmer Dixon, Lawrence Pool, Beekman Pool, Stephen Vehslage, Peter Briggs, Ralph Howe, John Reese, Jonathan Foster, Morris Clothier, Addison West, Whitten Morris, Michael Ferreira and Dylan Patterson. Former Head Squash Professional Ben Gould was World Squash Doubles Champion in 2009 (with Paul Price), 2011 (with Damien Mudge) and 2013 (with Damien Mudge). Club members who have been elected into the Squash Hall of Fame include William "Treddy" Ketcham, Ralph Howe and Peter Briggs.

The first intercollegiate squash team match was played at the Racquet and Tennis Club on February 17, 1923. Harvard defeated Yale 4 matches to 1.

Court Tennis and Racquets
Club members and professionals have been national and world champions in both court tennis and racquets. The most famous was Pierre Etchebaster, who was Court Tennis World Champion from 1928 to 1954. Other R & T Court Tennis World Champions include James Dear (1955-1957), Albert "Jack" Johnson (1957-1959), Northrup Knox (1959-1969), Pete Bostwick (1969-1972), Jimmy Bostwick (1972-1976) and Wayne Davies (1987-1994). R & T members who have won multiple U.S. Amateur Court Tennis Championships include Jimmy Van Alen, Ogden Phipps, Alastair Martin, Gene Scott and Morris Clothier. Club member Willie Surtees and Club professionals Neil Smith and James Dear were World Racquets Champions. Tim Chisholm, Head Professional from 1999 to 2004, was World Court Tennis Doubles Champion in 2001 (with Julian Snow). James Stout, who has been a professional at the Club since 2006, was World Racquets Champion from 2008 to 2019 and is currently Head Racquets and Squash Professional.

Backgammon
The Racquet and Tennis Club played an important role in the history of backgammon: In 1931 Wheaton Vaughan, who was then chairman of the club's Card and Backgammon Committee, invited representatives of selected New York City clubs and elsewhere and led the process to formulate and produce the Laws of Backgammon. This set of rules  is the basis of the rules according to which backgammon is played today and was published by Charles Scribner's Sons. Backgammon remains a vibrant game in the Club.

Membership
Like other single gender Manhattan clubs including the Colony (women-only), the Cosmopolitan (women-only), and the Knickerbocker (men-only), the R & T has maintained its men-only membership policy. Women are welcome at the Club for social and athletic events. In 1987, the Club did not allow Evelyn David an exemption to train for the Women's Court Tennis Championship, citing its membership rules.

See also
 List of American gentlemen's clubs
 List of New York City Designated Landmarks in Manhattan from 14th to 59th Streets
 National Register of Historic Places listings in Manhattan from 14th to 59th Streets

References
Notes

Sources
 Historic American Buildings Survey No. HABS NY-5466

External links

 Philip Howard Photographs of the Racquet and Tennis Club at the New-York Historical Society.

1876 establishments in New York (state)
Sports venues completed in 1918
Athletics clubs in the United States
Beaux-Arts architecture in New York City
Clubhouses on the National Register of Historic Places in Manhattan
Clubs and societies in the United States
New York City Designated Landmarks in Manhattan
McKim, Mead & White buildings
Racquets venues in the United States
Real tennis venues
Sports venues in Manhattan
Squash venues in the United States
Tennis venues in New York City
Gentlemen's clubs in the United States
Gentlemen's clubs in New York City
Clubs and societies in Manhattan
Midtown Manhattan
Sports venues on the National Register of Historic Places in New York City
Park Avenue
Tennis clubs
Backgammon